The City of Rockingham in Perth, Western Australia, was gazetted on 4 February 1897 as the Rockingham Road Board with a chairman and councillors under the Roads Boards Act 1871. With the passage of the Local Government Act 1960, all road boards became Shires with a shire president and councillors effective 1 July 1961, the Rockingham Road Board thereby becoming Shire of Rockingham. Rockingham attained city status on 12 November 1988, at which point the president became a mayor.

Rockingham's current mayor, Deb Hamblin was elected on 16 October 2021 and thereby became the first female to hold this office. Her predecessor, Barry Sammels, at the time of the announcement of his retirement in August 2021 had been the longest-serving active mayor in Western Australia, having first been elected mayor of Rockingham in 2003.

Previous to the 2021 elections, the mayor of Rockingham had historically been elected by the councillors. After an eight year debate, the council voted in September 2020 to change to a publicly-elected mayor.

Chairmen
The chairman of the Rockingham Road Board:

Shire presidents
The shire presidents of the Shire of Rockingham:

Mayors
The mayors of the City of Rockingham:

References

Rockingham
City of Rockingham